List of Grand Prix motorcycle racing FICM European Champions, from 1924 to 1939 and from 1981 to 2013, in order of year and engine displacement.

By season

2008–2013

1990–2007

1981–1989

1947–1948

1924–1939

By rider (1924–1939)

Multiple European Championship holders:

European Champions
Moto Europe